Zophoryctes is a monotypic genus of East African brushed trapdoor spiders containing the single species, Zophoryctes flavopilosus. It was first described by Eugène Simon in 1902, and has only been found in Madagascar.

References

Barychelidae
Monotypic Mygalomorphae genera
Spiders of Madagascar
Taxa named by Eugène Simon